The Revolutionary Communist Party (abbr. PCR-RCP) was a communist party in Canada ostensibly oriented around Marxism–Leninism–Maoism. It was not registered with Elections Canada because the party rejected what it called the "bourgeois electoral system" and did not seek recognition by the government.

The party arose following the Revolutionary Communist Conference, which was held in Montreal, Quebec in November 2000 by activists and former members of the labour union movements and youth organizations of the 1960s, 1970s and 1980s, who felt that the revolutionary situation in Canada warranted the creation of a party dedicated to a communist revolution. The party originated from the Revolutionary Communist Party (Organizing Committees). Conference participants adopted the party's first draft programme. Because of the location of the conference, the majority of the founding members were French-speaking Quebecers, and the party began to reach out to the rest of Canada, starting with the Canadian Revolutionary Congress held in November 2006 in Toronto.

The party split in 2017, resulting in two competing factions: the PCR-RCP (Central Committee) and the PCR-RCP (Historical Direction). The former dissolved itself on November 5, 2021.

Ideology 
The Revolutionary Communist Party denounced the traditional electoral system of Canada, claiming that it only furthered the agenda of what it called bourgeois democracy. The party was highly critical of what it called reformist and revisionist electoral communist parties such as the Communist Party of Canada and the Communist Party of Canada (Marxist–Leninist). They maintained that those parties helped to prop up a system of ruling-class domination of Canadian politics. Instead, the PCR-RCP claimed that a revolutionary movement in Canada should forcibly remove the ruling class from power and replace it with a socialist transitional system, and eventually a communist system, which would dissolve the apparatus of the state. The party believed that this could be done by following the ideology and examples of communist figures such as Karl Marx, Vladimir Lenin, and Mao Zedong. According to the party's programme, Canada must be liberated from oppression through various violent and non-violent means, including civil insurrection and protracted people's war, though they stressed the need for the creation of a strong vanguard party and popular support before this could occur. This differs from the tactics developed by other groups, such as the Cuban 26th of July Movement and the Front de libération du Québec, which believed in propaganda of the deed, which stipulates that a movement only needs a small nucleus of radical supporters willing to partake in dangerous and illegal activities to inspire the wider population into supporting their cause. The PCR-RCP regarded this tactic as premature, preferring instead to operate only after sufficient time and effort had been dedicated to strengthening the party.

Although their ideological affiliation claimed to be Marxism–Leninism–Maoism, the PCR-RCP advocated a critical and non-biased view of past revolutionary movements and socialist governments. Although they believed that Mao was the most ideologically advanced of all communist writers, they criticized some of his actions and motives. Like most Maoist organizations, the PCR-RCP was also highly critical of modern China, claiming that since Mao's death, it had abandoned socialism and adopted state capitalism.

While the majority of the PCR-RCP's supporters and members were French Quebecers, the PCR-RCP did not support the Quebec separatist movement like most other communist organizations in Quebec. They viewed the separatist movement as a ploy by the Québécois ruling class to strengthen their position internationally by removing Canadian ruling class influence from Quebec. As such, they were highly critical of other communist parties active in Quebec, such as the Communist Party of Quebec (Communist Party of Canada affiliate) and the Marxist–Leninist Party of Quebec (Communist Party of Canada (Marxist–Leninist) affiliate), alleging that their support of the Quebec separatist movement was paramount to supporting pseudo-nationalism, and that the creation of another capitalist state went against the principles of Marxism.

An in-depth explanation of the PCR-RCP's political ideology can be found in the party's official programme.

Affiliates 
The PCR-RCP was affiliated with several other organizations and publications.

The party was affiliated with the Committee for a Canadian Red Aid Organization.

Internationally, the party had close ties to the Revolutionary Internationalist Movement and its member organizations, although the party was never a member. The party also had contact with the Communist Party of Nepal (Maoist Centre).

In addition, the PCR-RCP had formed its own communist youth organization known as the Revolutionary Student Movement (MER-RSM), which as of 2014 had created chapters at several secondary and post-secondary institutions in Ontario, Quebec, and western Canada. The MER-RSM collapsed around the same time as the PCR-RCP.

History

Founding congress 
In late November 2006 the Revolutionary Communist Party (Organizing Committees) held a national congress which saw nearly 100 members and supporters from across Canada participate. This congress is seen as a critically important milestone for the party. Several supporting committees and organizations made speeches at the congress, including activists from as far west as Manitoba. In addition, a variety of international organizations and parties sent messages of solidarity, including the Committee of the Revolutionary Internationalist Movement (CoRIM), the Communist (Maoist) Party of Afghanistan, the Communist Workers Union of Colombia, Marxist–Leninist Revolutionaries of Iraq, the Communist Party of Iran (Marxist–Leninist–Maoist), and the Communist Party of the Philippines. All were messages of support, urging the RCP(OC) to develop the revolutionary situation in Canada while maintaining a proper critical outlook on the historical conditions of past and present communist movements.

In addition to the various messages received from external organizations, the RCP(OC) introduced several resolutions for popular vote on the assembly floor. The four resolutions were:

 Resolution to support the founding of the Revolutionary Communist Party
 Resolution to support the Revolutionary Internationalist Movement
 Resolution to support the revolutionary struggle in Nepal
 Resolution to hold a second Canadian Revolutionary Congress in Toronto

All resolutions were passed unanimously. An immediate consequence of the Canadian Revolutionary Congress was the creation of the Revolutionary Communist Party proper and the dropping of the Organizing Committees tag from the party's name.

Split 
A book launch for J. Moufawad-Paul's Continuity and Rupture was held at the Maison Norman Bethune on March 4, 2017. During the event, four members of the party's Montreal branch entered the bookstore and forcefully removed three other party members they deemed "anti-party elements". This prompted the central committee to expel the former four, and in response, the party's Montreal and Valleyfield cells published a polemic against the central committee and took full control of the party's website and finances. These cells declared themselves to be the real Revolutionary Communist Party, defending it from the "opportunist clique" in control of the central committee. The central committee announced the expulsion of the party cells in Montreal and Valleyfield on May 2, 2017.

The party subsequently split into the PCR-RCP (Central Committee) and PCR-RCP (Historical Direction). The PCR-RCP (Central Committee) retained control over fronts such as the Revolutionary Student Movement, as well as the rest of the party membership. It later set up a new website, leading to two competing websites of similar names.

The PCR-RCP (Central Committee) announced its dissolution on November 5, 2021.

References

External links 
 
 ISKRA website

Anti-revisionist organizations
Maoist organizations in Canada
Communist parties in Canada
Far-left politics in Canada
2007 establishments in Canada
Maoist parties